Tarik Ahsan is a Bangladeshi diplomat. He has been the Ambassador of Bangladesh to Portugal since early October 2020. Before this assignment, he was the High Commissioner (Ambassador) of Bangladesh to Pakistan since July 2016. Prior to that, Tarik Ahsan had been Bangladesh High Commissioner to Sri Lanka since October 2014.

Tarik Ahsan's tenure as High Commissioner in Islamabad was marked by tense Bangladesh-Pakistan relations. Despite the odds, Ahsan has made sustained efforts to reduce tension and stabilize the relation between the two countries. He has also reached out to the people of Pakistan to highlight Bangladesh's spirit of war of liberation, its achievements as an independent country and its commitment to peace and development.

While in Lisbon, Tarik Ahsan has been making sustained efforts for enhancing Bangladesh-Portugal relations at government as well as people's level.

Tarik Ahsan is also concurrently accredited as Bangladesh Ambassador to Guinea-Bissau and Cabo Verde as well as Bangladesh High Commissioner to Mozambique, with residence in Lisbon.

Biography
Ahsan began his diplomatic career as the Second Secretary and First Secretary at the Permanent Mission of Bangladesh to the United Nations in New York, USA in the years 1996 to 1999. During this time, he represented Bangladesh in First (Disarmament), Fourth (Political) and Sixth (Legal) Committees of UN General Assembly. Among other overseas assignments, Ahsan was Counsellor at Bangladesh Embassy in Riyadh, Saudi Arabia from 1999 to 2002; Counsellor and Minister at Bangladesh Embassy in Jakarta, Indonesia from 2006 to 2008; and Minister and Chargé d'affaires at Bangladesh Embassy in Berlin, Germany from 2008 to 2010. During this period, he had the distinction of being the 100th signatory on behalf of Bangladesh to the Founding Treaty of International Renewable Energy Agency.  With residence in Berlin, he also looked after Bangladesh's relation with Czech Republic, Slovakia, Slovenia and Austria. Back to Headquarters, Tarik Ahsan served as the Director General for International Organisations of the Ministry of Foreign Affairs (Bangladesh) from October 2010 to October 2014. Since late October 2014, Ahsan has been serving as Bangladesh's High Commissioner/Ambassador sequentially to Sri Lanka, Pakistan and Portugal.

References

External links
 Roll of Honour in website of Bangladesh Embassy in Lisbon
 Roll of Honour in website of Bangladesh High Commission in Islamabad
 Roll of Honour in website of Bangladesh High Commission in Colombo

Ambassadors of Bangladesh to Portugal
Year of birth missing (living people)
Living people
Bangladeshi diplomats
High Commissioners of Bangladesh to Pakistan
High Commissioners of Bangladesh to Sri Lanka
People from Dhaka